Adisorn Promrak (born October 21, 1993), simply known as Keng is a Thai professional footballer who plays as a Centre-back, he has also been used as a Right-back for Thai League 1 club Nongbua Pitchaya and the Thailand national team.

International career

Adisorn won the AFF U-19 Youth Championship with Thailand U19 and played in 2012 AFC U-19 Championship.
He represented Thailand U23 in the 2014 Asian Games. Adisorn is part of Thailand's squad in the 2014 AFF Suzuki Cup. Adisorn won the 2015 Southeast Asian Games with Thailand U23, and is the team's vice-captain. In 2016 Adisorn was selected in Thailand U23 squad for 2016 AFC U-23 Championship in Qatar.

International

Honours

Club
BEC Tero Sasana
 Thai League Cup (1): 2014
Muangthong United
 Thai League 1 (1): 2016
 Thai League Cup (2): 2016, 2017
 Thailand Champions Cup (1): 2017
 Mekong Club Championship (1): 2017

International
Thailand U-19
 AFF U-19 Youth Championship (1); 2011

Thailand U-23
 Sea Games  Gold Medal (1); 2015
 BIDC Cup (Cambodia) (1): 2013

Thailand
 ASEAN Football Championship (2): 2014, 2016
 King's Cup (2): 2016, 2017

References

External links
 
Adisorn Promrak profile  at Muangthong United website

1993 births
Living people
Adisorn Promrak
Adisorn Promrak
Adisorn Promrak
Association football defenders
Adisorn Promrak
Adisorn Promrak
Adisorn Promrak
Adisorn Promrak
Adisorn Promrak
Adisorn Promrak
Footballers at the 2014 Asian Games
Adisorn Promrak
Southeast Asian Games medalists in football
2019 AFC Asian Cup players
Competitors at the 2015 Southeast Asian Games
Adisorn Promrak